The  , officially called the All Japan Adults Football Tournament, is a football (soccer) cup competition in Japan. It is run by the Japan Football Association. As it only involves non-league teams (teams not affiliated to either J.League or the Japan Football League), it can be considered an equivalent of the FA Trophy or FA Vase in England.

Overview
The "Shakaijin", "Shakaijin Cup"  or "Zensha" as it is known, was first established in 1965 to determine potential entrants to the Japan Soccer League. The winner and runner-up played off in a promotion and relegation series against the bottom two clubs of the JSL. This continued even after the JSL added a Second Division in 1972. Since 1977, however, there is a system called the "Regional Football Champions League" to promote new league entrants (to the JSL 2nd Division, the former Japan Football League, and the current Japan Football League), thus the "Shakaijin" is now effectively a non-league cup competition. The 1999 edition was the only one to feature teams from the current JFL; otherwise, all participant clubs have been from the regional leagues.

The format is a week-long elimination tournament in a host locale (originally a single city, now a major metropolitan area) chosen by the JFA beforehand, and the best clubs of the regional leagues (currently 32 entrants) qualify. The final takes place in a major stadium in the largest host city or prefectural capital. The winner automatically qualifies to the Regional Champions League (runners-up and third places may also qualify depending on berth availability).

Many former Shakaijin winners are now J.League members, so the cup, despite no longer guaranteeing promotion, is considered a crucial stepping stone by ambitious clubs.

List of winners

See also
Japanese Super Cup
Emperor's Cup
J.League Cup

References

External links
JFA official page
Official site of the 2011 season at the JFA
Contents of Domestic Competition of Football in Japan
Japanese Non-League Football News (in English)

Football cup competitions in Japan
C
1965 establishments in Japan
Recurring sporting events established in 1965